Century eggs, also known under a wide variety of names (see infobox), are a Chinese egg-based culinary dish made by preserving duck, chicken, or quail eggs in a mixture of clay, ash, salt, quicklime, and rice hulls for several weeks to several months, depending on the method of processing.

Through the process, the yolk becomes a dark green to grey color, with a creamy consistency and strong flavor due to the hydrogen sulfide and ammonia present, while the white becomes a dark brown, translucent jelly with a salty flavor. The transforming agent in the century egg is an alkaline salt, which gradually raises the pH of the egg to around 9–12, during the curing process. This chemical process breaks down some of the complex, flavorless proteins and fats, which produces a variety of smaller flavorsome compounds.

Some eggs have patterns near the surface of the egg white which are likened to pine branches. These patterned eggs are regarded as having better quality than the normal century eggs and are called Songhua eggs, variously translated as pine flower eggs or pine-patterned eggs.

History
The method for creating century eggs likely came about through the need to preserve eggs in times of plenty by coating them in alkaline clay, which is similar to methods of egg preservation in some Western cultures. The clay hardens around the egg and results in the curing and creation of century eggs instead of spoiled eggs.

The century egg has at least four centuries of history behind its production. Its discovery, though not verifiable, was said to have occurred around 600 years ago in Hunan during the Ming Dynasty, when a homeowner discovered duck eggs in a shallow pool of slaked lime that was used for mortar during construction of his home two months before. Upon tasting the eggs, he set out to produce more – this time with the addition of salt to improve their flavor – resulting in the present recipe of the century egg. An alternate story involves a young duck farmer by the name of Shuige (water-brother), also from Hunan, leaving duck eggs in the garden of a woman by the name of Songmei (pine-sister) as a courting gesture. The eggs were not discovered until the woman cleaned out the ash pit half a month later where they had turned into century eggs. In her honour, the farmer named the transformed eggs with their delicate crystalline patterns on their surfaces "pine-patterned eggs".

Methods

Traditional
The traditional method for producing century eggs developed through improvement of the aforementioned primitive process. Instead of using only clay, a mixture of wood ash, calcium oxide, and salt is included in the plastering mixture, thereby increasing its pH and sodium content. The addition of calcium oxide and wood ash to the mixture lowers the risk of spoilage and also increases the speed of the process. Each egg is individually covered by hand, with gloves worn to protect the skin from chemical burns. It is then rolled in a mass of rice chaff, to keep the eggs from adhering to one another, before the eggs are placed in cloth-covered jars or tightly woven baskets. The mud slowly dries and hardens into a crust over several months. The eggs are then ready for consumption.

Modern
Even though the traditional method is still widely practised, modern understanding of the chemistry behind the formation of century eggs has led to many simplifications in the recipe. Today, soaking raw eggs in a solution of table salt, calcium hydroxide and sodium carbonate for 10 days, followed by several weeks of aging in an airtight container, can achieve a similar effect to the traditional method. This is because the chemical reaction needed to produce century eggs is accomplished by introducing hydroxide and sodium ions into the egg, regardless of the method used.

The extremely toxic compound lead(II) oxide speeds up the reactions which create century eggs, leading to its use by some unscrupulous producers, whereas zinc oxide is now the recommended alternative. Although zinc is essential for life, excessive zinc consumption can lead to copper deficiency, and the finished product should have its zinc level assessed for safety.

Uses
Century eggs can be eaten without further preparation other than peeling and rinsing them – on their own, or as a side dish. In central China, they are sliced into pieces and drizzled with some black vinegar and served as a side dish. As an hors d'œuvre, the Cantonese wrap chunks of this egg with slices of pickled ginger root (sometimes sold on a stick as street food). A Shanghainese recipe mixes chopped century eggs with chilled tofu. In Taiwan, it is popular to eat sliced century eggs placed on top of cold tofu with katsuobushi, soy sauce, and sesame oil, in a style similar to Japanese hiyayakko. A variation of this recipe common in northern China is to slice century eggs over chilled silken (soft) tofu, adding liberal quantities of shredded young ginger and chopped spring onions as a topping, and then drizzling light soy sauce and sesame oil over the dish, to taste. They are also used in a dish called old-and-fresh eggs, where chopped century eggs are combined with (or used to top) an omelette made with fresh eggs. The century eggs may also be cut into chunks and stir fried with vegetables, which is most commonly found in Taiwanese cuisine.

Some Chinese households cut them up into small chunks and cook them with rice porridge to create "century egg and lean pork congee". This is sometimes served in dim sum restaurants. Rice congee, lean pork, and century egg are the main ingredients. Peeled century eggs are cut into quarters or eighths and simmered with the seasoned marinated lean slivers of pork until both ingredients are cooked into the rice congee. Fried dough sticks known as youtiao are commonly eaten with century egg congee. Another common variation of this dish is the addition of salted duck eggs into the congee mixture.

At special events like wedding banquets or birthday parties, a first course platter of sliced barbecued pork, pickled baby leeks, sliced abalone, pickled julienned carrots, pickled julienned daikon radish, seasoned julienned jellyfish, sliced pork, head cheese and the quartered century eggs is served. This is called a lahng-poon in Cantonese, which simply means "cold dish".

Misconception and etymology
Century eggs are sometimes avoided due to the belief that they are prepared by soaking eggs in horse urine, but there is no valid evidence to support this. In Thai and Lao, the common word for century egg translates to "horse urine egg", due to the distinctive urine-like odor of the food:
  (RTGS: khai yiao ma)

Safety
Century eggs prepared in traditional ways are generally safe to consume. However, there have been incidents of malpractice in century egg production that causes eggs to be contaminated. In 2013, three factories in Jiangxi province were found to be using industrial copper sulphate in century egg production to shorten the production time. The industrial copper sulphate was contaminated with heavy metals and toxic chemicals. The incident was exposed on China's national broadcaster CCTV, causing local officials to shut down 30 factories for inspection. The police arrested three people involved in the case and seized four businesses involved in the case.

Gallery

See also

References

Citations

Sources

Taiwan Livestock Research Institute and Philippine Council for Agriculture (2001) Enhancing the Value of Eggs: How to Make Balut and Century Eggs. Retrieved 24 March 2007.

External links
 
 

Food preservation
Raw egg dishes
Chinese cuisine
Hong Kong cuisine
Macau cuisine
Tibetan cuisine
Philippine cuisine
Taiwanese cuisine
Thai cuisine
Christmas Island cuisine